Ina Gausdal (born 21 March 1991) is a Norwegian footballer who plays as a defender for Toppserien club LSK Kvinner FK and the Norway women's national team.

References

External links

1991 births
Living people
Norwegian women's footballers
Women's association football defenders
Toppserien players
Kolbotn Fotball players
LSK Kvinner FK players
Norway women's international footballers